Thousand Oaks Transit (TOT) is Thousand Oaks, California's transportation service, providing local routes that serve the need of those commuting within the city itself.

Routes
1 (Gold Line) Newbury Park
2 (Green Line) Central Thousand Oaks
3 (Red Line) Westlake
4 (Blue Line) Crosstown

Transit Center
The Thousand Oaks Transit Center is located at 265 S. Rancho Road.

Connecting routes include:

LADOT 423 to Downtown Los Angeles.

Metro routes 150, 161, 245.

All-time roster

References

Transportation in Thousand Oaks, California
Public transportation in Ventura County, California
Bus transportation in California
Newbury Park, California
Westlake Village, California